Michael James Bowie Hobbs  (15 February 1960  – 13 March 2012), generally known as Jock Hobbs, was a New Zealand rugby union player and administrator. A flanker, he played for Canterbury and won 21 caps for the New Zealand national team, the All Blacks, between 1983 and 1986, with four tests as captain.

In later years he was prominent in rugby administration. Between 2002 and 2010 he was chairman of the New Zealand Rugby Union before standing down due to illness.

Youth and playing career 
Hobbs was born in Christchurch. He played in the first XV at Christ's College in Christchurch, and was a regular first choice for Canterbury from the 1981 season onwards, playing in the failed Ranfurly Shield challenge against Waikato. His test debut came in 1983 against the British and Irish Lions, where he was successor to Graham Mourie. Others that were possible replacements were Bruce Middleton and Auckland captain Alwyn Harvey, but Hobbs played so well against the Lions that he was an automatic selection as All Blacks number seven for the next few seasons.

Hobbs was All Black captain on the short tour of Fiji late in 1984 when Andy Dalton was unavailable, and in the tour of Argentina in 1985 when Dalton was again unavailable. He took part in the 1986 New Zealand Cavaliers tour to South Africa, before retiring in 1987 after a succession of concussions.

Administrator
In 1995, Hobbs was instrumental in retaining New Zealand's leading players when they were on the verge of defecting to Kerry Packer's rebel World Rugby Corporation. In the 1996 Queen's Birthday Honours, he was appointed a Member of the New Zealand Order of Merit, for services to rugby.

In 2005, Hobbs led New Zealand's successful bid to host the 2011 Rugby World Cup and in the same year was named the Herald's New Zealander of the year. In the 2006 Queen's Birthday Honours, he was promoted to Companion of the New Zealand Order of Merit, for services to rugby and sports administration.

Hobbs was the longest serving chairman in NZRU history and his service to the game was recognized at the 2011 IRB and Steinlager Rugby awards where he received the Vernon Pugh award for Distinguished service and the Steinlager Salver award respectively.

In 2010, Hobbs stepped down from his administrative positions in order to battle leukaemia. He died of the disease on 13 March 2012 at Wellington Hospital.

References

External links

|-

1960 births
2012 deaths
New Zealand international rugby union players
Canterbury rugby union players
Companions of the New Zealand Order of Merit
New Zealand rugby union players
New Zealand Rugby Football Union officials
Rugby union flankers
University of Canterbury alumni
People educated at Christ's College, Christchurch
World Rugby Awards winners
Deaths from leukemia
Rugby union executives
Rugby union players from Christchurch
Deans family
Harper family